The following is a list of people connected to St. Mary's College of Maryland.

Alumni

 Julie Croteau Women's Major League Baseball pioneer, inducted into the Baseball Hall of Fame
 Jamie Roberts (2011)assistant coach, Catholic University women's basketball team, also named St. Mary's College Athlete of the Year in 2011 and awarded the school's Athletic Director’s Award. 
 Warren Strobel (1985)journalist, U.S. foreign policy and national security editor for Reuters (2011–present), senior correspondent for foreign affairs, Knight Ridder/McClatchy, 2002-2009 
 John F. Slade III (1964)Associate Judge with the 4th District Court of Maryland, former member of Maryland House of Delegates 
 James Benoit (1994)county councilman, fourth district of Anne Arundel County, Maryland 
 David Fraser-Hidalgo (1992)  member of the Maryland House of Delegates, representing District 15, sits on the Montgomery County Chamber of Commerce and the Hispanic Chamber of Commerce 
 Neil Irwin (2000)author and senior economics correspondent for The New York Times
 Stephen R. McHenry (1981)CEO of the non-profit corporation MARBIDCO (Maryland Agricultural and Resource Based Industry Development Corporation), which was established by the Maryland State Legislature in 2004 to advise and guide Maryland farmers, the Maryland seafood industry and forestry industry in establishing sustainable practices. The corporation also provides best practices technology adoption loans and works on land preservation issues as well. 
 Matthew Schissler (1993)founder of Cord Blood America, Inc.,<ref name="businessweek1">"Matthew Schissler: Executive Profile & Biography", Business Week", November 5, 2013</ref> a pioneer in harvesting non-embryonic stem cells for medical use; and Pyrenees Investments; was a semi-finalist for the 2008 Ernst and Young Entrepreneur of the Year Award.
 Kathleen ReinekeSt. Mary's County Teacher of the Year in 2014
 Paul Reed Smith (1978)luthier, founder of PRS Guitars 
 Evan Wallace (also known as "e-dubble")hip-hop artist, musician, poet
 Scott Steele (1981)Olympic silver medalist in sailboarding 
 Jesse Kirkland (2011)Olympic sailor, 49er racing dinghies
 Kay Aldridge (1934)actress, model, star of Perils of Nyoka.
 Brandon Scott politician, president of the Baltimore City Council and 52nd Mayor of Baltimore

Faculty
 Charles Adlerprofessor of physics and author of Wizards, Aliens, and Starships: Physics and Math in Fantasy and Science Fiction.
Michael Bunnmusician, principal tubist of the Kennedy Center Opera House Orchestra, Fairfax Symphony Orchestra and Filene Center Orchestra at Wolf Trap Farm Park; adjunct professor.
 Jeffrey J. Byrdmicrobiologist, science editor, author, editor for The Complete Idiot's Guide to Microbiology, editor-in-chief of the Journal of Microbiology and Biology Education, formerly called the Journal of Microbiology Education.
 Lucille Cliftonformer Poet Laureate of Maryland; two-time Pulitzer Prize finalist. Deceased.
 Garrey Denniespeechwriter for Nelson Mandela, writer, historian
Norton Dodgeeconomist, collector of dissident Soviet era art; smuggled thousands of Soviet dissident paintings, prints and sculptures out of communist Russia over a number of years and at great risk to his own life. Amassed one of the largest collections of Soviet-era art outside the Soviet Union. Now on permanent display at the Zimmerli Art Museum at Rutgers University. Deceased. 
 Todd Eberlypolitical analyst and commentator often quoted in The Washington Post, The Baltimore Sun and The Washington  Times, also heard on radio stations WYPR and WBAL. Author of American Government and Popular Discontent: Stability without Success. Was named "One of the Most Influential Voices in Maryland Politics" by Campaigns and Elections magazine.
Mary Adele Francefirst president of the junior college. She is credited with convincing the Maryland legislature that women attaining the right to vote made it rational to expand the former St. Mary's Female Seminary into a junior college. This occurred in 1927. She was also a science and math teacher at the school.
David Froomcomposer, Guggenheim Fellow, twice honored by the American Academy of Arts and Letters (Ives Scholarship, Academy Award for lifetime achievement), first prize in the Kennedy Center Friedheim Awards, commissioned by the Fromm Foundation of Harvard and the Koussevitzky Foundation of the Library of Congress, published by ACA.
 Michael Glaserformer Poet Laureate of Maryland. Professor Emeritus.
 Andrea Hammerfounder and first editor of the Slackwater Journal. Former professor. 
Earl Hofmannpainter, sculptor, educator. Part of Baltimore's 20th-century realist art school, studied with and assisted Jacques Maroger at the Maryland Institute College of Art. Considered a major part of the 20th century Baltimore art scene before relocating to Southern Maryland. Deceased.
 James A. Kenney, IIIjudge of the Maryland Court of Special Appeals (1997 - 2007), Assistant State's Attorney in St. Mary's County, Maryland (1964–67). Won the Maryland Leadership in Law Award in 2003. Adjunct professor.
 David Kungprofessor for how music and mathematics relate from The Great Courses
 Zach P. Messittepolitical analyst in radio, television and print media, political scientist. Former professor.
 Jane Margaret O'Brienthe St. Mary's College of Maryland's college's first female president (after it became a four-year college) and its fifth president overall (1996–2009). No longer affiliated.
Juliana Geran Pilonauthor of many books, including Notes from the other side of night, The UN: assessing Soviet abuses, The Bloody Flag: Post-Communist Nationalism in Eastern Europe : Spotlight on Romania, Why America Is Such a Hard Sell: Beyond Pride and Prejudice, Cultural Intelligence for Winning the Peace, Soulmates: Resurrecting Eve She is also director of the Center for Culture and Security at the Institute of World Politics in Washington, D.C. Former visiting professor.
 Henry Rosemont Jr.one of the world's top Confucian scholars, author of A Chinese Mirror; Rationality and Religious Experience. "Radical Confucianism and The Chinese Classic Of Family Reverence: A Philosophical Translation Of The Xiaojing". Deceased. 
Luis Enrique Sam ColopGuatemalan/Native American linguist, lawyer, poet, writer, newspaper columnist, promoter of the K'iche' language and social activist. Former Fulbright visiting scholar.
 Katherine Sochawinner, 2008 Alder Award from the Mathematical Association of America. Former professor.

Fellows

Nitze senior fellows visit St. Mary's College several times throughout their assigned year to give lectures and meet with Nitze scholars and other St. Mary's students.Previous Nitze fellows include: Sophie Delaunay, executive director, Doctors Without Borders/Médecins Sans Frontières in the United States. (2011-2012)
 Nicholas Thompson (2010–2011)
 John Prendergast (2009–2010)
 T.R. Reid (2008–2009)
 Kathleen Kennedy Townsend (2007–2008)
 David E. Sanger (2006–2007)
 Edward P. Jones (2005–2006)
 Diane Rehm (2004–2005)
 Josiah Ober (2003–2004)
 Norine G. Johnson (2002–2003)
 Mario Livio (2001–2002)
 Wole Soyinka
 Henry Rosemont, Jr.
 Michael Ellis-Tolaydo
 Lucille Clifton (spring 2001)
 Judge Thomas Penfield Jackson (fall 2000)
 Richard Lewontin (spring 2000)
 Ben Cardin (fall 1999)

President
 Tuajuanda C. Jordan, 2014–present

Trustees
 Benjamin C. Bradlee vice president at large, The Washington Post Steny Hoyer House Majority Leader U.S. House of Representatives, (2007–2011) U.S. Representative for Maryland's 5th congressional district (since 1981); 
 Steven Muller president, Johns Hopkins University (1972–1990)
 General Andrew J. Goodpaster,Robert Jordan, "An Unsung Soldier: The Life of Gen. Andrew J. Goodpaster", Naval Institute Press, September 15, 2013, Appendix, page XXV Superintendent of the United States Military Academy at West Point, New York (1977-1981), NATO's Supreme Allied Commander, Europe (SACEUR) from July 1, 1969 and Commander in Chief of the United States European Command (CINCEUR) from May 5, 1969 until his retirement December 17, 1974.
 William Donald Schaefer former Governor of Maryland (1987–1995); former Comptroller of Maryland (1999–2007)
 Ben Cardin  U.S. Senator from Maryland (2007–present); Former speaker of the Maryland House of Delegates, (1979–1986); U.S. House of Representatives 1987–2007
J. Frank Raley  State Senator and state representative, president of St. Mary's College board for nearly three decades, advocate for education and economic development, award-winning environmentalist 
 Thomas Penfield Jackson presiding judge in the United States v. Microsoft'' case, former Judge, United States District Court for the District of Columbia.
 Stephanie Rawlings-Blake, Mayor of Baltimore, 2010–present, President, Baltimore City Council, 2007-2010
 Anthony K. Lake National Security Advisor under U.S. President Bill Clinton (1993–1997)
 Thomas Waring, entrepreneur, education advocate for international understanding 
 Sven Erik Holmes, Chief Justice, State of Oklahoma, from 2003-2005, District Court Judge, United States District Judge for the Northern District of Oklahoma, 1995-2005
 Paul Nitze Secretary of the Navy, 1963-1967, U.S. Arms Control Negotiator (SALT talks), 1969-1976 
 Gary Jobson Winner of the America's Cup for sailing. Inducted into the America's Cup Hall of Fame in 1999. Emmy award-winning sports commentator, award-winning author.

References

People
St. Mary's College of Maryland